The 7th Canadian Infantry Division was an infantry division of the Canadian Army, mobilized in the spring of 1942 and assigned for home defence within Atlantic Command, during World War II.

At the time it was assumed it would consist of volunteers and proceed overseas. By the summer of 1942 it became obvious that there would not be enough volunteers, so National Resource Mobilization Act (NRMA) conscripts were assigned to the regiments of the Division to bring their numbers up to war establishment strength.

This meant that the Division could only be used for home defence, unless the Parliament of Canada ruled that conscripted men could be sent overseas. Two brigades were assembled in the early fall of 1942 in Camp Debert in Nova Scotia with the third at Camp Sussex in New Brunswick.

Order of battle
May 1942

 Headquarters, 7th Division 
 7th Division Intelligence Section 
 No. 7 Field Security Section 
 No. 7 Defence and Employment Platoon  (Lorne Scots)

16th Canadian Infantry Brigade

 The Prince of Wales' Own Rangers
 The Oxford Rifles
 The Winnipeg Light Infantry
 No. 16 Defence Platoon (Lorne Scots)

17th Canadian Infantry Brigade

 The Victoria Rifles of Canada
 2nd Battalion, The Black Watch (RHR) of Canada
 The Dufferin and Haldimand Rifles of Canada
 No. 17 Defence Platoon (Lorne Scots)

18th Canadian Infantry Brigade

 The Sault Ste. Marie and Sudbury Regiment
 The Rocky Mountain Rangers
 1st Battalion, Irish Fusiliers of Canada (Vancouver Regiment)
 No. 18 Defence Platoon (Lorne Scots)
Units of the supporting arms included:

 Canadian Armoured Corps:
 30th Reconnaissance Battalion (The Essex Regiment)
 Royal Canadian Artillery: 
 Headquarters, Seventh Divisional Artillery, RCA 
 22nd Field Regiment
 3rd Field Battery 
 6th Field Battery 
 80th Field Battery 
 23rd Field Regiment
 31st Field Battery 
 36th Field Battery 
 83rd Field Battery 
 24th Field Regiment
 49th Field Battery 
 84th Field Battery 
 85th Field Battery 
 10th Light Anti-Aircraft Regiment 
 6th Light AA Battery 
 7th Light AA Battery 
 8th Light AA Battery 
 9th Light AA Battery 
 8th Anti-Tank Regiment 
 10th AT Battery
 11th AT Battery
 12th AT Battery
 13th AT Battery
 Corps of Royal Canadian Engineers: 
 Headquarters 7th Divisional Engineers, RCE 
 5th Field Park Company, RCE 
 15th Field Company, RCE 
 23rd Field Company, RCE 
 27th Field Company, RCE
 Royal Canadian Corps of Signals: 
 Headquarters 7th Divisional Signals RCCS

Plus units of the RCASC, RCAMC, RCOC, CPC, etc.

External links
 7th Division at www.canadiansoldiers.com

Infantry divisions of Canada
Canadian World War II divisions
Military units and formations established in 1942
Military units and formations disestablished in 1945